Yangoupokpi-Lokchao Wildlife Sanctuary is an Indo-Burma wildlife sanctuary in Chandel district of Manipur. It is in the Indo-Myanmar border about 110 km from Imphal. It has an area of 184.80 square kilometers.

The ecosystem of this wildlife sanctuary is unique and vibrant. It represents the Indo-Myanmar biological diversity (Indo-Burma). It is because of the strategic location of the wildlife sanctuary in the meeting point of the two major geographical zones, India and Myanmar (Burma).

History 
Yangoupokpi-Lokchao Wildlife Sanctuary was established in the year 1989.

Fauna 

Hoolock gibbon is the only ape species found in India. It lives in this wildlife sanctuary. Sometimes, elephants also migrated from the Indo-Myanmar border.

Visiting seasons 
The best season to visit the sanctuary is from October to April. The best time to visit is during the early morning.

Rest houses 
There are some rest houses in and around the sanctuary. These are: (1) Forest Rest House, Moreh, (2) Indo-Myanmar Trade Center Rest House, Moreh, (3) Transit Camp at Wildlife Office, Moreh.

See also 
 Imphal Peace Museum
 INA War Museum
 Kakching Garden
 Keibul Lamjao National Park - world's only floating national park in Manipur, India
 Khonghampat Orchidarium
 Loktak Folklore Museum
 Manipur State Museum
 Manipur Zoological Garden 
 Mizoram–Manipur–Kachin rain forests
 Phumdi - Floating biomasses in Manipur, India
 Sekta Archaeological Living Museum

References

External links 

 Yangoupokpi - Lokchao Wildlife Sanctuary - datazone.birdlife.org
 Yangoupokpi Lokchao Wild life Sanctuary - e-pao.net
 ‘Sounds of wildlife no longer heard at Yangoupokpi Lokchao in Tengnoupal’ - www.ifp.co.in
 Yangoupokpi sanctuary under threat - www.thesangaiexpress.com
 Yangoupokpi-Lokchao Wildlife Sanctuary - kanglaonline.com

Protected areas of Manipur
Wildlife sanctuaries of India
Chandel district